Pasquale Malipiero, called the dux pacificus (1392 in Venice – May 5, 1462 in Venice) was a Venetian statesman who served as the 66th Doge of Venice from October 30, 1457 until his death. He succeeded Francesco Foscari, and was specifically elected by enemies of the Foscari family. In 1458, he signed into law a number of measures limiting the power of the Council of Ten.

Malipiero was interred in the Basilica di San Giovanni e Paolo, a traditional burial place of the doges. He was succeeded as Doge by Cristoforo Moro.

Pasquale was married to Giovanna Dandolo.

References

1392 births
1462 deaths
15th-century Doges of Venice